Urnyak (Ürnäk) is a rural locality (a village) in Miyakibashevsky Selsoviet, Miyakinsky District, Bashkortostan, Russia. The population was 89 as of 2010. There are 3 streets.

Geography 
Urnyak is located 11 km east of Kirgiz-Miyaki (the district's administrative centre) by road. Nikolskoye is the nearest rural locality.

References 

Rural localities in Miyakinsky District